Nisf Al-Ozal is a sub-district located in the Shar'ab ar-Rawnah District, Taiz Governorate, Yemen. Nisf Al-Ozal had a population of 2,410 according to the 2004 census.

References

Sub-districts in Shar'ab ar-Rawnah District